Live at Village West is a live album by bassist Ron Carter and guitarist Jim Hall recorded in New York City in 1982 and released on the Concord Jazz label.

Reception

The AllMusic review by Ken Dryden said "The second live collaboration between bassist Ron Carter and guitarist Jim Hall follows their first recording together by a decade, but their chemistry together is every bit as strong, if not improved ... Highly recommended".

Track listing 
 "Bag's Groove" (Milt Jackson) – 4:11
 "All the Things You Are" (Jerome Kern, Oscar Hammerstein II) – 5:38
 "Blue Monk" (Thelonious Monk) – 5:07
 "New Waltz" (Ron Carter) – 6:01
 "St. Thomas" (Sonny Rollins) – 4:27
 "Embraceable You" (George Gershwin, Ira Gershwin) – 6:37
 "Laverne Walk" (Oscar Pettiford) – 5:13
 "Baubles, Bangles, & Beads" (Robert Wright, George Forrest) – 5:02

Personnel 
Ron Carter - bass 
Jim Hall – guitar

References 

Ron Carter live albums
Jim Hall (musician) live albums
1984 live albums
Concord Records live albums